On the Chin may refer to:

"On the Chin", a song by Kings of Leon on their 2013 album Mechanical Bull
"On the Chin", a song by Tortoise on their 2004 album It's All Around You